Carex purpureovaginata is a tussock-forming species of perennial sedge in the family Cyperaceae. It is native to south eastern parts of Brazil.

See also
List of Carex species

References

purpureovaginata
Taxa named by Johann Otto Boeckeler
Plants described in 1879
Flora of Brazil